The 1990–91 Danish Cup was the 37th installment of the Danish Cup, the highest football competition in Denmark.

Final

Regulation Game

Replay

References

1990-91
1990–91 domestic association football cups
Cup